Zentralbibliothek Zürich (Zurich Central Library) is the main library of both the city and the University of Zurich, housed in the Predigerkloster, the former Black Friars' abbey, in the old town's Rathaus quarter.
It was founded in 1914 by a merger of the former cantonal and city libraries. Its history ultimately goes back to the Stiftsbibliothek of the Grossmünster abbey, first attested in 1259. Much of the abbey's library was lost in the Swiss Reformation, especially in an incident of book burning on 14 September 1525, reducing it to a total inventory of 470 volumes. From 1532, Konrad Pellikan (1478–1556) began rebuilding the Stiftsbibliothek, especially with the purchase of Zwingli's private library, and the library catalogue in 1551 lists 770 volumes. The city library had been established in 1634, and its policy to allow access only to citizens of Zurich led to disputes with the university, which led to the establishment of a cantonal library in 1835, built from   some 3,500 volumes with 14,000 titles of the Stiftsbibliothek, some 340 volumes of the recent University Library (since 1833) and some 1,700 volumes of the Gymnasiumsbibliothek (since 1827).

The Zentralbibliothek currently houses some 5.1 million items, among these 3.9 million printed volumes, 124,000 manuscripts, 243,000 maps and 560,000 microfiches.

Cultural Heritage 
Predigerkirche and the adjoint Musikabteilung (literally: music department) are listed in the Swiss inventory of cultural property of national and regional significance as a Class object.

See also 
 Pestalozzi-Bibliothek Zürich, a public library network in Zürich
 Predigerkirche Zürich
 Predigerkloster

References

External links 
Official Zentralbibliothek Zürich website—
Zentralbibliothek Zürich website—
Main public library catalog (NEBIS)

Libraries in Zürich
University of Zurich
Buildings and structures in the canton of Zürich
Cultural property of national significance in the canton of Zürich
Culture of Zürich
Academic libraries in Switzerland